= Nombu kanji =

Nombu kanjii is a porridge of lentils, rice, and coconut milk. In South India it is made during Ramadan to break the fast in the evening.
